Constituency WR-11 is a reserved seat for women in the Khyber Pakhtunkhwa Assembly.

2013
Romana Jalil

See also
 Constituency WR-01
 Constituency WR-02
 Constituency WR-03
 Constituency WR-04
 Constituency WR-22
 Constituency MR-2
 Constituency MR-3

References

Khyber Pakhtunkhwa Assembly constituencies